Batrachorhina jejuna is a species of beetle in the family Cerambycidae. It was described by Hermann Julius Kolbe in 1894. It is known from Tanzania, Kenya, and South Africa.

References

Batrachorhina
Beetles described in 1894
Taxa named by Hermann Julius Kolbe